The electoral district of Warrandyte is an Australian electoral district of the Victorian Legislative Assembly. It is an outer metropolitan electorate and contains the suburbs of Park Orchards, Ringwood North, Warrandyte, Warrandyte North, Warrandyte South, Warranwood, Wonga Park, most of Donvale, and parts of Chirnside Park, Doncaster East, and Ringwood.

Warrandyte was originally a marginal seat, being held by the Liberal Party from the creation of the electorate at the 1976 election until it lost government at the 1982 election. The seat was then Labor-held until the 1988 election, when Phil Honeywood became the only Liberal to win a seat from Labor.

Honeywood made the seat very secure for the Liberals, to the extent that he comfortably held the seat at the 2002 election, despite over half of his Legislative Assembly colleagues losing their seats.  Honeywood became Deputy Leader of the Opposition, before retiring at the 2006 election. Fellow Liberal, Ryan Smith, easily retained the seat. 

Lots of parks and schools fill this lush green area outside of Melbourne. It is known for the Mullum Mullum Creek, Currawong Bush Park and The Yarra River. Lots of families and retirees live in this area, thus making it more Liberal.

Members for Warrandyte

Election results

See also
 Parliaments of the Australian states and territories
 List of members of the Victorian Legislative Assembly

References

External links
 Electorate profile: Warrandyte District, Victorian Electoral Commission

1976 establishments in Australia
Electoral districts of Victoria (Australia)
City of Manningham
Electoral districts and divisions of Greater Melbourne